The 2011 CFU Club Champions’ Cup was the 13th edition of the CFU Club Championship, the annual international club football competition in the Caribbean region, held amongst clubs whose football associations are affiliated with the Caribbean Football Union (CFU). The top three teams in the tournament qualified for the 2011–12 CONCACAF Champions League.

Participating teams
The following teams were all entered into the competition.

th – Title holders

The following associations did not enter a team:

 Anguilla
 Aruba
 Bahamas
 Barbados
 British Virgin Islands
 Cuba
 Curaçao

 Dominican Republic
 French Guiana
 Grenada
 Guadeloupe
 Jamaica
 Martinique

 Montserrat
 Saint Martin
 Saint Vincent and the Grenadines
 Sint Maarten
 Turks and Caicos Islands
 United States Virgin Islands

Competition format
The draw for the tournament took place on February 2, 2011. The first two rounds were played as two-leg, aggregate-goal series. The away goals rule would be applied, and extra time and penalty shootout would be used to decide the winner if necessary. The defending champion, Puerto Rico Islanders, received a bye to the second round. The final round, which consists of the semifinals, the third-place match, and the final, were played as one-leg matches. The original schedule as announced by the CFU is as follows (however, many matches of the first two rounds were played outside the original schedule):

It was originally announced that the final round would be played at Trinidad and Tobago. However, it was announced on May 12, 2011 that Guyana's Alpha United, one of the semifinalists, would host the final round at Providence Stadium in Providence, Guyana, with the semifinals on May 25, and the third-placed match and the final on May 27.

Preliminary phase

Elimination stage 1
The first round schedule was announced on March 2, 2011.

|}
Notes
Note 1: Order of legs reversed after original draw.
Note 2: Bath Estate and Bassa withdrew from the competition. Tempête and Alpha United advanced automatically.

First leg

Notes
Note 3: Match played in Cayman Islands instead of Puerto Rico.

Second leg

Defence Force won 4–1 on aggregate.

2–2 on aggregate; Milerock won on the away goals rule.

Caledonia AIA won 6–0 on aggregate.

River Plate won 2–1 on aggregate.

WBC won 6–1 on aggregate.

Elimination stage 2
The second round schedule was announced on April 1, 2011.

|}
Notes
Note 4: Order of legs reversed after original draw.

First leg

Second leg

Alpha United won 3–2 on aggregate.

Defence Force won 7–0 on aggregate.

1–1 on aggregate; Tempête won on penalties.

Puerto Rico Islanders won 8–1 on aggregate.

Notes
Note 5: Match played in Guyana instead of Puerto Rico.
Note 6: Delayed from April 29, 2011 because of Caledonia's travel issues to Haiti.

Final phase
The draw for the final round was made on May 16, 2011. All matches were played at Providence Stadium in Providence, Guyana.

Semifinals

Third place match

Final

Puerto Rico Islanders, Tempête, and Alpha United qualified for the Preliminary Round of the 2011–12 CONCACAF Champions League.

Top goalscorers

Source:

References

External links

Caribbean Football Union
Results from CONCACAF

2011
1
2011–12 CONCACAF Champions League